The South London derby is the name given to a football derby contested by any two of Charlton Athletic, Crystal Palace, Millwall, Sutton United, and AFC Wimbledon, the five professional Football Association clubs that play in the Football League in South London, England. It is sometimes more specifically called the South East London derby when played between Charlton and Millwall. The close geographical proximity of all the teams contributes significantly to the rivalries.

Charlton and Millwall are located in South East London, with Millwall's The Den based in New Cross and Charlton's The Valley situated in Greenwich, being less than four miles apart. Crystal Palace are based further south in the suburb of Selhurst, their stadium Selhurst Park being six miles from The Den and eight from The Valley. Since 2020, AFC Wimbledon have been located at the new Plough Lane in Merton, South West London, which is five miles west of Selhurst Park, eight from The Den, and seven and a half from The Valley. Sutton United play at Gander Green Lane in west Sutton, five miles south of Plough Lane and nearly eight miles west of Selhurst Park. 

According to a 2013 fan survey on football rivalries, Charlton considers their main rival to be Crystal Palace, with Millwall being their second biggest rival. Millwall's main rivalry is with East London club West Ham United, with Palace placed second and Charlton third. Crystal Palace fans consider their main rival to be Brighton, with Millwall second and Charlton third. AFC Wimbledon's main rivalry is with Milton Keynes Dons, with their fans considering Crystal Palace their second biggest rival. Sutton's rivals include AFC Wimbledon and non-league team Bromley.

Millwall was founded in 1885, with Palace and Charlton both founded twenty-years later in 1905. The earliest fixture between two of the teams was in 1906 when Crystal Palace and Millwall first met in the Southern League. The two teams have contested the most games, over 130 derbies. Palace and Millwall both entered the Football League in the 1920–21 season. Charlton joined the next year in the 1921–22 season, playing in the same division as Palace and Millwall for the first time. Wimbledon were founded in 1889 and spent the majority of their history as an amateur club, until joining the Football League in the 1977–78 season. In 2003 Wimbledon were relocated to Milton Keynes as part of a franchise takeover and became Milton Keynes Dons. During this period of decline, the club reformed as a phoenix club in 2002, founded by supporters against the move, renaming itself AFC Wimbledon, as it won a rapid succession of non-League promotions to gain Football League status nine years later. AFC Wimbledon played their first derby in 2009, an FA Cup game against Millwall. Sutton United were founded in 1898 but only played their first competitive derby in 2017, an FA Cup game against AFC Wimbeldon. Sutton gained promotion into the English Football League  for the first time in the 2020–21 season, finishing champions of the National League. 

Millwall hold a winning record over Charlton, Palace, and Wimbledon. Charlton has a losing record against all three clubs. AFC Wimbledon and Crystal Palace both have winning records against Charlton but have yet to play a game against each other. Sutton has a winning record over Wimbledon and have yet to play another South London team. As of the 2022–23 season, Crystal Palace play in the Premier League, Millwall play in the Championship, Charlton play in League One, and Sutton United and AFC Wimbledon play in League Two.

History

Early rivalries

Millwall were founded in 1885, some 20 years before Charlton Athletic and Crystal Palace, who were both founded in 1905. Soon after Crystal Palace were formed, they joined the Southern Football League, of which Millwall were founding members. The two teams played against each other for ten seasons in this league. The first contested competitive game between the sides was played on 17 November 1906, with Palace winning 3–0 although the fixture was not yet a South London derby – Millwall were based in East London until 1910. Up until that point the most successful team based in South London was Woolwich Arsenal, who were the first Southern member elected to the Football League in 1893.

Charlton Athletic's early years were somewhat hindered by the presence of Woolwich Arsenal, who were the closest team in locality and were well supported. Charlton spent the first years of their history playing in non-professional leagues and did not play either Palace or Millwall. Eventually, Woolwich Arsenal moved to North London, losing the 'Woolwich' from their name, in 1913. The same year Charlton adopted senior status. They became a professional team in 1920, joining the Southern League. Both Millwall and Crystal Palace joined the Football League in the 1920–21 season, playing in the Third Division, while Charlton Athletic joined the year after for the 1921–22 season, finally competing at the same level as both their South London neighbours. Wimbledon became a Football League club five decades later in the 1977–78 season, playing their first South London derby against Millwall in 1980.

Four in the same league
There have been two occasions where four of the current five South London teams have played in the same league together. In the 1985–86 season, Charlton Athletic, Crystal Palace, Millwall and Wimbledon all competed in the Second Division. Charlton finished 2nd and Wimbledon 3rd, both being automatically promoted. Palace finished 5th and Millwall 9th. The 1989–90 season signifies the only time all four teams competed in the First Division together, the top tier of English football. Wimbledon finished the season 8th, Palace 15th and Charlton and Millwall were relegated, finishing 19th and 20th respectively.

Ground sharing
During World War II Millwall's ground The Den was severely damaged by a German bomb and a fire destroyed a stand a few days later. For a brief time the club was invited by their neighbours to play their games at The Valley and Selhurst Park. In 1984 Charlton went into administration. The club were forced to leave The Valley just after the start of the 1985–86 season after its safety was criticised by league officials. The club began a groundshare with Crystal Palace at Selhurst Park, which lasted for six years until 1991. After another year groundsharing at West Ham United's Upton Park, Charlton moved back into The Valley in 1992. Wimbledon groundshared at Selhurst Park from 1991 until their relocation to Milton Keynes in 2003. The campaign of Wimbledon's fans against the relocation led to the formation of AFC Wimbledon.

Notable matches
Crystal Palace 3–0 Millwall Athletic (17 November 1906)
The first meeting between any of the three original teams saw Palace, who were only formed a year prior, secure a comfortable victory over the visitors from East London. It was a Southern League match watched by 6,000 fans at the Crystal Palace National Sports Centre.
Millwall 0–3 Crystal Palace (31 October 1910)
This was the first game between the teams since Millwall moved to South London (in 1910), making this the first true South London derby. 3,000 supporters watched a Palace victory at The Den in a London PFA Charity Fund game. The match against their new neighbours was Millwall's second game at their new ground.
Millwall 0–1 Crystal Palace (15 January 1921)
First derby contested in The Football League. Palace won the Third Division game with a second half goal in front of 20,000 fans. Palace also won the reverse fixture 3–2 which was held only a week later on 22 January 1921, to complete the first South London Football League double and continue their early dominance of Millwall.
Millwall 2–0 Charlton Athletic (10 October 1921)
This London PFA Charity Fund fixture was the first contest between the two teams, which Millwall won 2–0 in front of 10,000 supporters at The Den.
Millwall 0–1 Charlton Athletic (31 December 1921)
On New Year's Eve of 1921 the teams met for their first League match, which Charlton won 1–0 at The Den. This was Charlton's first season as a Football League club and they completed a rare double over Millwall, winning the return fixture at The Valley 2–1. 
Charlton Athletic 1–1 Crystal Palace (14 November 1925)
The first competitive game played between the teams took place in the Third Division (south), and ended with a 1–1 draw at The Valley.
Millwall 6–0 Charlton Athletic (3 January 1931)
This Second Division game between the sides remains the widest winning margin between any of the clubs. Millwall led 1–0 at half-time and scored five more times in the second half, with goals from Harold Wadsworth (2), Joe Readman (2), Andrew Swallow and Jack Landells.
Millwall 2–2 Wimbledon (5 April 1980)
Wimbledon's first South London Derby was away at Millwall in the Third Division. The game ended in a draw in front of a crowd of 5,364. This was the Wombles third season as a Football League club, they finished bottom of the table and were relegated.
Wimbledon 0–3 Crystal Palace (4 May 1991)
The last South London derby and last ever game at Plough Lane. Wimbledon were forced to move at the end of the season due to a new FA rule requiring all-seater stadiums. They started ground-sharing with Palace at Selhurst Park the following season. Palace won the game with a hat-trick by Ian Wright in the second half. Palace finished 3rd and Wimbledon 7th in the 1990–91 First Division.
Charlton Athletic 1–3 Crystal Palace (aggregate score, 12 & 15 May 1996)
Crystal Palace and Charlton met in the 1996 First Division play-off semi-final, after they finished third and sixth in the league respectively. Palace won the first leg at The Valley 2–1, and 1–0 in the second leg three days later. Palace went on to lose the play-off final to Leicester City 1–2 at Wembley.
Wimbledon 0–1 Millwall (24 March 2004)
A crowd of just 3,043 at the National Hockey Stadium in Milton Keynes saw Wimbledon's last game against South London opponents before they were renamed as MK Dons. A goal in the first half from Tim Cahill was enough to seal a win for Millwall against a Wimbledon side that finished bottom of the First Division and were relegated.
Charlton Athletic 2–2 Crystal Palace (15 May 2005) 
Despite being ahead 2–1 with seven minutes left to play, Palace were unable to see out a win over their rivals. Charlton defender Jonathan Fortune scored an equaliser in the season's final game. Had Palace won they would have avoided relegation from the Premier League but instead became the first club to be relegated from the top-flight of English football four times.
Millwall 4–1 AFC Wimbledon (9 November 2009)
AFC Wimbledon's first competitive South London derby was a match against Millwall at The Den in the first round of the FA Cup. Kenny Jackett's League One side won 4–1 against the Conference National side.
Charlton Athletic 4–4 Millwall (19 December 2009)
The first meeting of the sides since 1996 ended in the highest-scoring game between the teams. Millwall went 2–0 up through two Steve Morison goals but Charlton converted two penalties through Deon Burton. Millwall's Jimmy Abdou was sent off early in the second half and The Lions went twice behind to the home team but Danny Schofield scored a last-minute equaliser. Both teams wore special kits for the match in honour of murdered local teenagers and supporters Jimmy Mizen and Rob Knox. The logos of both clubs' shirt sponsors were replaced by the text, "Street violence ruins lives".
Charlton Athletic 1–2 AFC Wimbledon (17 September 2016)
AFC Wimbledon's first win in a south London derby. Also their first derby in the Football League, with their two previous derbies against Millwall being losses in cup competitions. Wimbledon came from a goal down to win, with a Tyrone Barnett goal in the 85th minute.
Charlton Athletic 0–1 Millwall (3 July 2020)
First South London derby League game to be played with no fans present and in the summer. The game was re-arranged from 4 April due to the Coronavirus pandemic. The game was won in the 81st minute with a goal by Jake Cooper.
AFC Wimbledon 2–2 Charlton Athletic (20 March 2021)
AFC Wimbledon's first south London derby at their new Plough Lane ground. No fans were present due to the Coronavirus pandemic. Charlton led twice through goals from Jayden Stockley and Diallang Jaiyesimi. A brace from Ryan Longman made sure Wimbledon earned a point in their battle against relegation, and denting Charlton's play-off push. Wimbledon were 23rd and Charlton 6th in the table at the end of the game.
Sutton United 0–0 AFC Wimbledon (7 January 2017)
First competitive South London derby for Sutton United was an FA Cup Third round match against AFC Wimbledon at Gander Green Lane. The game ended in a goalless draw, with Sutton winning the replay 3–1.
AFC Wimbledon 0–1 Sutton United (15 October 2022)
Sutton United's first ever South London derby in a league game was an away win at Plough Lane, with captain Craig Eastmond scoring the only goal of the game in the 30th minute, securing Sutton's first away win of the season.

Charlton Athletic v AFC Wimbledon
Charlton and AFC Wimbledon first met in 2016, after Wimbledon were promoted via the League Two playoffs and Charlton were relegated from the Championship. Wimbledon won their first ever meeting at The Valley 2–1. Charlton won only one of their first six meetings, with Wimbledon knocking Charlton out of the FA Cup in 2017 and Football League Trophy on penalties in 2018. Charlton completed the double over their local rivals in the 2018–19 season. Charlton hold their only superior record (in the league) in South London derbies, with Wimbledon dominating cup competitions, having won all four cup games.

By competition

Full list of results
Score lists home team first.

Charlton Athletic v Crystal Palace
Charlton and Crystal Palace first met in 1925 in the Third Division (South), with the match ending in a 1–1 draw. Palace dominated their first 20 meetings, winning 13, and losing only four. Palace have completed the league double over Charlton six times, in 1926–27, 1927–28, 1964–65, 1968–69, 1989–90, and 2012–13. Charlton have done it twice, in 1999–2000 and 2007–08. Palace's longest unbeaten run in the fixture is nine games between 1993 and 1996, where they won six and drew three, including knocking their rivals out of the 1996 First Division Play-offs. Charlton's best unbeaten run is four games (three wins and a draw) twice, between 1982–83 and 2004–08.

By competition

This table only includes competitive first team games, excluding all pre-season games, friendlies, abandoned matches, testimonials and games played during World War I & II.

Full list of results
Score lists home team first.

Charlton Athletic v Millwall
The teams first met in 1921, with Charlton winning at The Den 1–0. They won the return fixture at The Valley 2–1, completing the first Football League double over their local rivals. Millwall hold the record for the longest unbeaten run between the teams at 14 games. Between 1922 and 1930, the Lions won eight and drew six. Charlton's longest unbeaten run against Millwall is six games, between 1934 and 1968 they won three and drew three. The longest period the clubs have gone without playing each other is 31 years (between the 1935–36 and 1965–66 seasons), due to being in different leagues. Millwall also have a run of 12 games unbeaten between 1979 and 1992, where they won six and drew six. Millwall have completed a League double over Charlton ten times (in 1923–24, 1924–25, 1931–32, 1932–33, 1968–69, 1970–71, 1971–72, 1988–89, 1992–93 and 2019–20) compared to Charlton's three (in 1921–22, 1934–35 and 1995–96). Millwall have the most wins in a row in the derby with five (twice). Charlton has won two games in a row (four times). The teams didn't play each other for 13 years, competing in different leagues between the 1996–97 and 2008–09 seasons. Millwall are currently on a twelve-game unbeaten streak against Charlton (their joint-second longest), with seven wins and five draws spanning 26 years (1996–2022). Many Millwall fans do not consider Charlton a serious rival due to the one-sided nature of the contest. The Lions have won 37 (50%) of the 74 league fixtures between the teams spanning 101 years, with the Addicks only winning 11 games (14%).

By competition

This table only includes competitive first-team games, excluding all pre-season games, friendlies, abandoned matches, testimonials and games played during the First and Second World Wars.

Full list of results
Score lists home team first.

Crystal Palace v Millwall
The first meeting between the sides was in 1906 in the Southern League, when Millwall Athletic were still an East London side. Palace won the game 3–0 at the Crystal Palace National Sports Centre. Millwall moved south of the river in 1910 and the first true South London derby between the teams was held on 31 October 1910. It was a London PFA Charity Fund game, which Palace won 3–0 and was just Millwall's second game at their new ground, The Den. The first derby contested in The Football League was on 15 January 1921. Palace won the Third Division (south) game 1–0. They also won the reverse fixture which was held a week later; 3–2, to complete the first Football League double over their South London neighbours. Palace have completed a Football League double over Millwall seven times (in 1920–21. 1949–50, 1963–64, 1968–69, 1977–78, 1963–64, 1986–87, 1989–90.) Millwall have completed a Football League double over Palace six times (in 1925–26, 1926–27, 1957–58, 1959–60, 2001–01, 2010–11.) Palace's longest unbeaten streak is seven games, they won six and drew one game against Millwall between 1986 and 1993. Millwall's longest unbeaten streak against Palace is 19 games, between 1950 and 1958 they won 11 and drew 8 games.

By competition

Full list of results
Score lists home team first.

Millwall v AFC Wimbledon
Millwall and Wimbledon first met in the First round of the FA Cup in 2009, when Wimbledon were playing in the Conference National. Millwall won the game 4–1. The two sides have only played in the same tier together once, in the 2016–17 League One season and both games were drawn. They've played two other cup games; a 2–1 win for Millwall in the League Cup in 2013 and most recently in 2019, an FA Cup Fifth round game at Kingsmeadow, which Millwall won 1–0.

By competition

Full list of results
Score lists home team first.

Sutton United v AFC Wimbledon
Sutton United and Wimbledon first met in the Third round of the FA Cup on 7 January 2017, when Sutton were a non-league club playing in the National League. The teams drew 0–0 at Gander Green Lane. Sutton won the replay 3–1 at Kingsmeadow.

By competition

Full list of results
Score lists home team first.

All-time results
The table includes all competitive first-team games played between the London rivals. From the first game played between Crystal Palace and Millwall on 17 November 1906, to the most recent South London derby played by newly promoted Sutton United. Defunct club Wimbledon's results are included in a separate table below.

Crossing the divides

Managers
Jimmy Seed, Alan Mullery, Iain Dowie, Ian Holloway and Alan Pardew have all permanently managed two South London clubs. Seed was in charge of Charlton for 23 years from 1933 to 1956, leading them to one of the most successful periods of their history, with successive promotions to the top-flight and an FA Cup Final win in 1947. He was sacked in 1956 after a bad run of form and took over at Millwall in 1958. Seed's start at The Den was poor, with the team going nine matches without a win. The team finished in 23rd place in Division Three (south). The following year saw The Lions playing in the new Fourth Division in which they finished 9th. Seed resigned at the end of that season, but stayed with the club as a director until his death on 16 July 1966.

Alan Mullery was in charge of Charlton from 1981 to 1982 and left to take the helm at Crystal Palace, where he remained manager until 1984. Theo Foley was Charlton manager from 1970 to 1974 and was briefly in charge of Millwall as a caretaker manager in 1977. Steve Gritt, who was joint-manager at Charlton with Alan Curbishley from 1991 to 1995, was also caretaker at Millwall briefly in 2000. Lennie Lawrence was Charlton's manager from 1982 to 1991 and was assistant manager at Crystal Palace, before joining former manager Dougie Freedman at Bolton Wanderers.

Iain Dowie was in charge of Crystal Palace between 21 December 2003 and 22 May 2006, when he was allowed to resign from his post, apparently to return to northern England because his wife was homesick. However, eight days later Premier League club Charlton unveiled Dowie as their new manager. Simon Jordan, Palace's chairman, immediately issued Dowie with a writ, claiming that he had misled him about his reasons for leaving the club; Dowie, however, insisted this was not the case, and was publicly backed by Charlton chief executive Peter Varney, who branded the writ "a sad and pathetic publicity stunt", and chairman Richard Murray, who was adamant that his legal team could find no grounds for the writ to be upheld, and suggested that there may be more personal reasons behind the writ being issued. The case was heard in the High Court in the summer of 2007 where a judge ruled that Dowie had lied when negotiating his way out of his contract. His spell at Charlton was largely unsuccessful and they parted company on 13 November 2006, after just 15 games in charge.

Ian Holloway took charge of Crystal Palace in November 2012. He guided them to promotion to the Premier League via the 2013 Football League play-offs, after beating Watford 1–0 with a penalty converted by Kevin Philips in extra time. On 23 October 2013, Holloway left the club by mutual consent after less than a year in charge. He managed to gain only three points from their first eight games in the top flight. On 6 January 2014, Holloway signed a two-and-a-half-year deal with Millwall, taking over from Steve Lomas. On 6 January 2014 he signed two-and-a-half-year deal with Millwall, taking over from Steve Lomas. He guided the club to Championship safety for the 2013–14 season as Millwall finished 19th, four points above the relegation places. In the 2014–15 season, as Millwall dropped in the relegation places in The Championship, Holloway admitted that he had become an unpopular manager with the Millwall fans. On 10 March 2015, Holloway was sacked, with the team second from bottom in the Championship and having lost five of their last six games. Former Charlton player Gary Rowett became Millwall manager on 21 October 2019. Rowett played 13 games for Charlton in the Premier League before being forced to retire through injury. Former Addicks player Johnnie Jackson managed Charlton from December 2021 until he was sacked in May 2022. Later that month, he signed a two-year contract as AFC Wimbledon managern.

Players

Players who have played for at least two of the four clubs are listed below. As of 18 August 2012 (the last game he played for Millwall), Darren Ward has played the most games for South London teams, with 317 appearances in total (232 for Millwall, 69 for Crystal Palace and 16 for Charlton). Peter Burridge played 114 games for Palace, 87 for Millwall and 44 for Charlton. He holds the record for most goals scored by a player for South London clubs, with 104 in 245 appearances.

Charlton & Palace
 Alan Pardew
 Bobby Goldthorpe
 Chris Powell
 Conor Gallagher
 Danny Butterfield
 Darren Ambrose
 Darren Pitcher
 Dave Madden
 David Whyte
 Don Townsend
 Gary Borrowdale
 Gonzalo Sorondo
 Hermann Hreiðarsson
 Jerome Thomas
 Jesurun Rak-Sakyi
 John Salako
 John Humphrey
   Jonny Williams
 Leon McKenzie
 Les Fell
 Marcus Bent
 Mark Hudson
 Mathias Svensson
 Mike Flanagan
 Paddy McCarthy
 Paul Kitson
 Paul Mortimer
 Paul Williams
 Rhoys Wiggins
 Scott Sinclair
 Sullay Kaikai
 Thomas Myhre
 Tom Soares
 Tony Burns

Charlton & Millwall
 Alan McLeary
 Ben Roberts
 Ben Thatcher
 Benny Fenton
 Bobby Hunt
 Charlie Hannaford
 Charlie MacDonald
 Danny Haynes
 Danny Shittu
 Dany N'Guessan
 Dave Mehmet
 Eamon Dunphy
 Ernie Watkins
 Federico Bessone
 Fred Ford
 Gordon Bolland
 Hameur Bouazza
 Harry Cripps
 Izale McLeod
 Jack Burkett
 James Thompson
 Jimmy Yardley
 Jim Ryan
 John Sullivan
 Johnny Summers
 Josh Wright
 Kevin Lisbie
 Kim Grant
 Lawrie Madden
 Lee Power
 Lindsay Smith
 Mark McCammon
 Martyn Waghorn
 Mickey Bennett
 Nicky Bailey
 Nicky Johns
 Pat Terry
 Paul Sturgess
 Phil Walker
 Phil Warman
 Terry Brisley
 Therry Racon
 Tony Towner
 Tony Warner
 Trésor Kandol

Millwall & Palace
 Andy Frampton
 Andy Gray
 Andy Roberts
 Anton Otulakowski
 Bill Roffey
 Bobby Bowry
 Bruce Dyer
 Carl Veart
 Chris Armstrong
 Chris Day
 Clive Allen
 Dave Martin
 David Fry
 Derek Jeffries
 Derek Possee
 Eberechi Eze
 Harry Redmond
 James Williams
 Jamie Moralee
 Jamie Vincent
 Jason Puncheon
 Jermaine Easter
 John Brearley
 John Jackson
 Johnny Roche
 Kenny Brown
 Kevin Muscat
 Lewis Grabban
 Matt Lawrence
 Mel Blyth
 Neil Emblen
 Neil Ruddock
 Nick Chatterton
 Noel Whelan
 Owen Garvan
 Paul Ifill
 Paul Hinshelwood
 Paul Sansome
 Phil Barber
 Ray Wilkins
 Ricky Newman
 Ryan Smith
 Shaun Derry
 Steve Claridge
 Steve Lovell
 Tony Craig
 Tony Witter
 Trevor Aylott

Charlton & AFC Wimbledon
 Barry Fuller
 Deji Oshilaja
 Jason Euell
 Joe Pigott
 Michael Smith
 Yado Mambo
Millwall & AFC Wimbledon
 Alex Pearce
 Andy Frampton
 Jack Smith
 Jimmy Abdou
 Paul Robinson
 Peter Sweeney
Charlton, Palace & Millwall
 Darren Ward
 Dave Tuttle
 Freddy Wood
 Jonathan Obika
 Leon Cort
 Mark Bright
 Nathan Ashton
 Peter Burridge
 Ricardo Fuller
 Tony Hazell
Charlton, Millwall & AFC Wimbledon
 Jamie Stuart
 Lyle Taylor

Wimbledon FC and AFC Wimbledon

The 2003 relocation and 2004 renaming of Wimbledon F.C. as Milton Keynes Dons meant that a South London derby team was lost. In 2002 some Wimbledon supporters formed a new team, AFC Wimbledon, based at Kingsmeadow in Kingston upon Thames. The non-League club started in the Combined Counties League, and played their first competitive South London derby on 9 November 2009, losing 4–1 away at Millwall in an FA Cup first-round match. Having worked their way up through non-League with five promotions in nine seasons, AFC Wimbledon were promoted first into Football League Two for the 2011–12 season. They spent five seasons at that level before being promoted into League One for the 2016–17 season, where they competed in the same league as Charlton Athletic and Millwall.

Wimbledon FC's derby results
Wimbledon played their first South London derby against Millwall on 5 April 1980, a game which ended 2–2. On 24 March 2004, they played their last derby also against Millwall, which they lost 0–1. Their record in all competitions against Charlton, Crystal Palace and Millwall is as follows:

Gallery

See also
Millwall F.C.–West Ham United F.C. rivalry
Brighton & Hove Albion F.C.–Crystal Palace F.C. rivalry
AFC Wimbledon–Milton Keynes Dons F.C. rivalry
Leeds United F.C.–Millwall F.C. rivalry
London derbies

Notes

References

Bibliography

External links
Charlton Athletic official website
Crystal Palace official website
Millwall official website
Sutton United official website
AFC Wimbledon official website

Charlton Athletic F.C.
Crystal Palace F.C.
Millwall F.C.
Sutton United F.C.
Wimbledon F.C.
AFC Wimbledon
England football derbies
London derbies
Articles containing video clips

pl:Derby zachodniego Londynu